Ethmia mansita is a moth in the family Depressariidae. It is found in central Mexico.

The ground color of the forewings is pale gray, overlaid with whitish and with black markings. The ground color of the hindwings is pale brownish, but whitish basally. Adults are on wing in September.

References

Moths described in 1914
mansita